John Rimmer (born 5 February 1939) is a New Zealand composer.

Biography
John Francis Rimmer was born in Auckland. He earned a Bachelor of Arts degree in 1961 from the University of New Zealand in 1961, a Master of Arts in 1963 from the University of Auckland with Ronald Tremain, where he also completed post-graduate studies in musicology. He continued his studies, earning a Doctor of Music degree in 1972 from the University of Toronto in electronic music with Gustav Ciamaga and in composition with John Weinzweig.

After completing his education, Rimmer worked as a lecturer at North Shores Teachers College in Auckland from 1970–74 and taught at the University of Auckland from 1974–99, where he was awarded a chair in music in 1995. He served as composer-in-residence at the University of Otago in 1972 and to the Auckland Philharmonia in 2002–03. Rimmer founded the electronic music studio at the University of Auckland in 1976 and the Karlheinz Company in 1978. His works have been performed internationally in Asia, Australia, New Zealand, Europe and North America.

Rimmer and his wife Helen reside in Tapu Bay, Kaiteriteri, New Zealand. Notable students include Susan Frykberg and Dorothy Ker.

Honors and awards
Rimmer received a number of prizes and awards in recognition of his contributions to music, including:

Philip Neil Memorial Prize, University of Otago in Dunedin, 1971, for Composition 2
Philip Neil Memorial Prize, University of Otago in Dunedin, 2003, for Bowed Insights
First Prize in the International Horn competition in the USA, 1983, for De Aestibus RerumPrix de la Confédération Internationale de la Musique Électroacoustique de Bourges, 1986, for Fleeting ImagesWorks
Rimmer composes for stage, orchestra, chamber, choral, piano, and electroacoustic performances. His compositions have been recorded and are available on media. Selected works include:At the Appointed Time, for orchestraA dialogue of opposites, for cello solo	 	 Au concerto, for bass clarinet and ensemble	 Bowed Insights, for string quartetBeyond the saying, electronic music	 	 
Concerto for viola and orchestra (1980)Composition 2, for wind quintet and electronic sounds	 December Nights, for chamber orchestra	De Aestibus Rerum, for chamber quintet	 Europa concerto, for brass band and orchestra	 Fleeting Images, electroacoustic workMahurangi – Place of Importance'' for solo viola (1992)

References

1939 births
20th-century classical composers
Living people
New Zealand classical composers
Male classical composers
New Zealand music teachers
People from Auckland
University of Auckland alumni
Academic staff of the University of Auckland
University of New Zealand alumni
Academic staff of the University of Otago
University of Toronto alumni
20th-century male musicians